The language of mathematics has a vast vocabulary of specialist and technical terms. It also has a certain amount of jargon: commonly used phrases which are part of the culture of mathematics, rather than of the subject. Jargon often appears in lectures, and sometimes in print, as informal shorthand for rigorous arguments or precise ideas. Much of this is common English, but with a specific non-obvious meaning when used in a mathematical sense.

Some phrases, like "in general",  appear below in more than one section.

Philosophy of mathematics
 abstract nonsenseA tongue-in-cheek reference to category theory, using which one can employ arguments that establish a (possibly concrete) result without reference to any specifics of the present problem. For that reason, it's also known as general abstract nonsense or generalized abstract nonsense.

 canonicalA reference to a standard or choice-free presentation of some mathematical object (e.g., canonical map, canonical form, or canonical ordering). The same term can also be used more informally to refer to something "standard" or "classic". For example, one might say that Euclid's proof is the "canonical proof" of the infinitude of primes.

 deepA result is called "deep" if its proof requires concepts and methods that are advanced beyond the concepts needed to formulate the result. For example, the prime number theorem — originally proved using techniques of complex analysis — was once thought to be a deep result until elementary proofs were found. On the other hand, the fact that π is irrational is usually known to be a deep result, because it requires a considerable development of real analysis before the proof can be established — even though the claim itself can be stated in terms of simple number theory and geometry.
 elegantAn aesthetic term referring to the ability of an idea to provide insight into mathematics, whether by unifying disparate fields, introducing a new perspective on a single field, or by providing a technique of proof which is either particularly simple, or which captures the intuition or imagination as to why the result it proves is true. In some occasions, the term "beautiful" can also be used to the same effect, though Gian-Carlo Rota distinguished between elegance of presentation and beauty of concept, saying that for example, some topics could be written about elegantly although the mathematical content is not beautiful, and some theorems or proofs are beautiful but may be written about inelegantly.

 elementaryA proof or a result is called "elementary" if it only involves basic concepts and methods in the field, and is to be contrasted with deep results which require more development within or outside the field. The concept of "elementary proof" is used specifically in number theory, where it usually refers to a proof that does not resort to methods from complex analysis.
 folklore A result is called "folklore" if it is non-obvious, non-published, yet somehow generally known to the specialists within a field. In many scenarios, it is unclear as to who first obtained the result, though if the result is significant, it may eventually find its way into the textbooks, whereupon it ceases to be folklore.

 naturalSimilar to "canonical" but more specific, and which makes reference to a description (almost exclusively in the context of transformations) which holds independently of any choices. Though long used informally, this term has found a formal definition in category theory.
 pathologicalAn object behaves pathologically (or, somewhat more broadly used, in a degenerated way) if it either fails to conform to the generic behavior of such objects, fails to satisfy certain context-dependent regularity properties, or simply disobeys mathematical intuition. In many occasions, these can be and often are contradictory requirements, while in other occasions, the term is more deliberately used to refer to an object artificially constructed as a counterexample to these properties. A simple example is that from the definition of a triangle having angles which sum to π radians, a single straight line conforms to this definition pathologically.

Note for that latter quote that as the differentiable functions are meagre in the space of continuous functions, as Banach found out in 1931, differentiable functions are colloquially speaking a rare exception among the continuous ones. Thus it can hardly be defended any-more to call non-differentiable continuous functions pathological.
 rigor (rigour)The act of establishing a mathematical result using indisputable logic, rather than informal descriptive argument. Rigor is a cornerstone quality of mathematics, and can play an important role in preventing mathematics from degenerating into fallacies.
 well-behavedAn object is well-behaved (in contrast with being pathological) if it satisfies certain prevailing regularity properties, or if it conforms to mathematical intuition (even though intuition can often suggest opposite behaviors as well). In some occasions (e.g., analysis), the term "smooth" can also be used to the same effect.

Descriptive informalities
Although ultimately every mathematical argument must meet a high standard of precision, mathematicians use descriptive but informal statements to discuss recurring themes or concepts with unwieldy formal statements. Note that many of the terms are completely rigorous in context.
 almost all A shorthand term for "all except for a set of measure zero", when there is a measure to speak of.  For example, "almost all real numbers are transcendental" because the algebraic real numbers form a countable subset of the real numbers with measure zero.  One can also speak of "almost all" integers having a property to mean "all except finitely many", despite the integers not admitting a measure for which this agrees with the previous usage.  For example, "almost all prime numbers are odd". There is a more complicated meaning for integers as well, discussed in the main article.  Finally, this term is sometimes used synonymously with generic, below.
 arbitrarily large Notions which arise mostly in the context of limits, referring to the recurrence of a phenomenon as the limit is approached. See also frequently.
 arbitrary A shorthand for the universal quantifier.  An arbitrary choice is one which is made unrestrictedly, or alternatively, a statement holds of an arbitrary element of a set if it holds of any element of that set. Also much in general-language use among mathematicians: "Of course, this problem can be arbitrarily complicated".
 eventuallyIn the context of limits, this is shorthand meaning for sufficiently large arguments; the relevant argument(s) are implicit in the context.  As an example, the function log(log(x)) eventually becomes larger than 100"; in this context, "eventually" means "for sufficiently large x."
 factor through A term in category theory referring to composition of morphisms.
 finite "Not infinite". For example, if the variance of a random variable is said to be finite, this implies it is a non-negative real number.
 frequently In the context of limits, this is shorthand for arbitrarily large arguments and its relatives; as with eventually, the intended variant is implicit.  As an example, the sequence  is frequently in the interval (1/2, 3/2), because there are arbitrarily large n for which the value of the sequence is in the interval. 

 formal, formally Qualifies anything that is sufficiently precise to be translated straightforwardly in a formal system. For example. a formal proof, a formal definition.
 
 generic This term has similar connotations as almost all but is used particularly for concepts outside the purview of measure theory.  A property holds "generically" on a set if the set satisfies some (context-dependent) notion of density, or perhaps if its complement satisfies some (context-dependent) notion of smallness.  For example, a property which holds on a dense Gδ (intersection of countably many open sets) is said to hold generically.  In algebraic geometry, one says that a property of points on an algebraic variety that holds on a dense Zariski open set is true generically; however, it is usually not said that a property which holds merely on a dense set (which is not Zariski open) is generic in this situation.
 in general In a descriptive context, this phrase introduces a simple characterization of a broad class of objects, with an eye towards identifying a unifying principle.  This term introduces an "elegant" description which holds for "arbitrary" objects.  Exceptions to this description may be mentioned explicitly, as "pathological" cases.

Occasionally, these are used in the sense of lvalue and rvalue: an RHS is primitive, and an LHS is derivative.
 nice A mathematical object is colloquially called nice or sufficiently nice if it satisfies hypotheses or properties, sometimes unspecified or even unknown, that are especially desirable in a given context. It is an informal antonym for pathological. For example, one might conjecture that a differential operator ought to satisfy a certain boundedness condition "for nice test functions," or one might state that some interesting topological invariant should be computable "for nice spaces X."
 onto A function (which in mathematics is generally defined as mapping the elements of one set A to elements of another B) is called "A onto B" (instead of "A to B" or "A into B") only if it is surjective; it may even be said that "f is onto" (i. e. surjective). Not translatable (without circumlocutions) to some languages other than English.
 proper If, for some notion of substructure, objects are substructures of themselves (that is, the relationship is reflexive), then the qualification proper requires the objects to be different. For example, a proper subset of a set S is a subset of S that is different from S, and a proper divisor of a number n is a divisor of n that is different from n.  This overloaded word is also non-jargon for a proper morphism.
 regular  A function is called regular if it satisfies satisfactory continuity and differentiability properties, which are often context-dependent. These properties might include possessing a specified number of derivatives, with the function and its derivatives exhibiting some nice property (see nice above), such as Hölder continuity. Informally, this term is sometimes used synonymously with smooth, below. These imprecise uses of the word regular are not to be confused with the notion of a regular topological space, which is rigorously defined.
 resp. (Respectively) A convention to shorten parallel expositions. "A (resp. B) [has some relationship to] X (resp. Y)" means that A [has some relationship to] X and also that B [has (the same) relationship to] Y. For example, squares (resp. triangles) have 4 sides (resp. 3 sides); or compact (resp. Lindelöf) spaces are ones where every open cover has a finite (resp. countable) open subcover.
 sharp Often, a mathematical theorem will establish constraints on the behavior of some object; for example, a function will be shown to have an upper or lower bound.  The constraint is sharp (sometimes optimal) if it cannot be made more restrictive without failing in some cases. For example, for arbitrary non-negative real numbers x, the exponential function ex, where e = 2.7182818..., gives an upper bound on the values of the quadratic function x2. This is not sharp; the gap between the functions is everywhere at least 1. Among the exponential functions of the form αx, setting α = e2/e = 2.0870652... results in a sharp upper bound; the slightly smaller choice α = 2 fails to produce an upper bound, since then α3 = 8 < 32. In applied fields the word "tight" is often used with the same meaning. 
 smooth Smoothness is a concept which mathematics has endowed with many meanings, from simple differentiability to infinite differentiability to analyticity, and still others which are more complicated.  Each such usage attempts to invoke the physically intuitive notion of smoothness.
 strong, stronger A theorem is said to be strong if it deduces restrictive results from general hypotheses. One celebrated example is Donaldson's theorem, which puts tight restraints on what would otherwise appear to be a large class of manifolds.  This (informal) usage reflects the opinion of the mathematical community: not only should such a theorem be strong in the descriptive sense (below) but it should also be definitive in its area.  A theorem, result, or condition is further called stronger than another one if a proof of the second can be easily obtained from the first but not conversely. An example is the sequence of theorems: Fermat's little theorem, Euler's theorem, Lagrange's theorem, each of which is stronger than the last; another is that a sharp upper bound (see sharp above) is a stronger result than a non-sharp one.  Finally, the adjective strong or the adverb strongly may be added to a mathematical notion to indicate a related stronger notion; for example, a strong antichain is an antichain satisfying certain additional conditions, and likewise a strongly regular graph is a regular graph meeting stronger conditions. When used in this way, the stronger notion (such as "strong antichain") is a technical term with a precisely defined meaning; the nature of the extra conditions cannot be derived from the definition of the weaker notion (such as "antichain").
 sufficiently large, suitably small, sufficiently close In the context of limits, these terms refer to some (unspecified, even unknown) point at which a phenomenon prevails as the limit is approached. A statement such as that predicate P holds for sufficiently large values, can be expressed in more formal notation by ∃x : ∀y ≥ x : P(y).  See also eventually.
 upstairs, downstairs A descriptive term referring to notation in which two objects are written one above the other; the upper one is upstairs and the lower, downstairs.  For example, in a fiber bundle, the total space is often said to be upstairs, with the base space downstairs.  In a fraction, the numerator is occasionally referred to as upstairs and the denominator downstairs, as in "bringing a term upstairs".
 up to, modulo, mod out by An extension to mathematical discourse of the notions of modular arithmetic.  A statement is true up to a condition if the establishment of that condition is the only impediment to the truth of the statement. Also used when working with members of equivalence classes, especially in category theory, where the equivalence relation is (categorical) isomorphism; for example, "The tensor product in a weak monoidal category is associative and unital up to a natural isomorphism."
 vanish To assume the value 0. For example, "The function sin(x) vanishes for those values of x that are integer multiples of π." This can also apply to limits: see Vanish at infinity.
 weak, weaker The converse of strong.
 well-defined Accurately and precisely described or specified. For example, sometimes a definition relies on a choice of some object; the result of the definition must then be independent of this choice.

Proof terminology
The formal language of proof draws repeatedly from a small pool of ideas, many of which are invoked through various lexical shorthands in practice.
 aliter An obsolescent term which is used to announce to the reader an alternative method, or proof of a result. In a proof, it therefore flags a piece of reasoning that is superfluous from a logical point of view, but has some other interest.
 by way of contradiction (BWOC), or "for, if not, ..." The rhetorical prelude to a proof by contradiction, preceding the negation of the statement to be proved.
 if and only if (iff) An abbreviation for logical equivalence of statements.
 in general In the context of proofs, this phrase is often seen in induction arguments when passing from the base case to the induction step, and similarly, in the definition of sequences whose first few terms are exhibited as examples of the formula giving every term of the sequence.
 necessary and sufficient A minor variant on "if and only if"; "A is necessary (sufficient) for B" means "A if (only if) B".  For example, "For a field K to be algebraically closed it is necessary and sufficient that it have no finite field extensions" means "K is algebraically closed if and only if it has no finite extensions".  Often used in lists, as in "The following conditions are necessary and sufficient for a field to be algebraically closed...".
 need to show (NTS), required to prove (RTP), wish to show, want to show (WTS) Proofs sometimes proceed by enumerating several conditions whose satisfaction will together imply the desired theorem; thus, one needs to show just these statements.
 one and only one A statement of the existence and uniqueness of an object; the object exists, and furthermore, no other such object exists.
 Q.E.D. (Quod erat demonstrandum): A Latin abbreviation, meaning "which was to be demonstrated", historically placed at the end of proofs, but less common currently, having been supplanted by the Halmos end-of-proof mark, a square sign ∎.
 sufficiently nice A condition on objects in the scope of the discussion, to be specified later, that will guarantee that some stated property holds for them. When working out a theorem, the use of this expression in the statement of the theorem indicates that the conditions involved may be not yet known to the speaker, and that the intent is to collect the conditions that will be found to be needed in order for the proof of the theorem to go through.
 the following are equivalent (TFAE) Often several equivalent conditions (especially for a definition, such as normal subgroup) are equally useful in practice; one introduces a theorem stating an equivalence of more than two statements with TFAE.
 transport of structure It is often the case that two objects are shown to be equivalent in some way, and that one of them is endowed with additional structure.  Using the equivalence, we may define such a structure on the second object as well, via transport of structure.  For example, any two vector spaces of the same dimension are isomorphic; if one of them is given an inner product and if we fix a particular isomorphism, then we may define an inner product on the other space by factoring through the isomorphism.

 without (any) loss of generality (WLOG, WOLOG, WALOG), we may assume (WMA) Sometimes a proposition can be more easily proved with additional assumptions on the objects it concerns.  If the proposition as stated follows from this modified one with a simple and minimal explanation (for example, if the remaining special cases are identical but for notation), then the modified assumptions are introduced with this phrase and the altered proposition is proved.

Proof techniques
Mathematicians have several phrases to describe proofs or proof techniques. These are often used as hints for filling in tedious details.

 angle chasing Used to describe a geometrical proof that involves finding relationships between the various angles in a diagram.
 back-of-the-envelope calculation An informal computation omitting much rigor without sacrificing correctness.  Often this computation is "proof of concept" and treats only an accessible special case.
 brute force Rather than finding underlying principles or patterns, this is a method where one would evaluate as many cases as needed to sufficiently prove or provide convincing evidence that the thing in question is true. Sometimes this involves evaluating every possible case (where it is also known as proof by exhaustion).
 by example A proof by example is an argument whereby a statement is not proved but instead illustrated by an example. If done well, the specific example would easily generalize to a general proof.
 by inspection A rhetorical shortcut made by authors who invite the reader to verify, at a glance, the correctness of a proposed expression or deduction. If an expression can be evaluated by straightforward application of simple techniques and without recourse to extended calculation or general theory, then it can be evaluated by inspection. It is also applied to solving equations; for example to find roots of a quadratic equation by inspection is to 'notice' them, or mentally check them. 'By inspection' can play a kind of gestalt role: the answer or solution simply clicks into place.
 by intimidation Style of proof where claims believed by the author to be easily verifiable are labelled as 'obvious' or 'trivial', which often results in the reader being confused.
 clearly, can be easily shown A term which shortcuts around calculation the mathematician perceives to be tedious or routine, accessible to any member of the audience with the necessary expertise in the field; Laplace used obvious (French: évident).
 complete intuition  commonly reserved for jokes (puns on complete induction).
 diagram chasing Given a commutative diagram of objects and morphisms between them, if one wishes to prove some property of the morphisms (such as injectivity) which can be stated in terms of elements, then the proof can proceed by tracing the path of elements of various objects around the diagram as successive morphisms are applied to it.  That is, one chases elements around the diagram, or does a diagram chase.
 handwaving A non-technique of proof mostly employed in lectures, where formal argument is not strictly necessary.  It proceeds by omission of details or even significant ingredients, and is merely a plausibility argument.
 in general In a context not requiring rigor, this phrase often appears as a labor-saving device when the technical details of a complete argument would outweigh the conceptual benefits.  The author gives a proof in a simple enough case that the computations are reasonable, and then indicates that "in general" the proof is similar.
 index battle for proofs involving objects with multiple indices which can be solved by going to the bottom (if anyone wishes to take up the effort). Similar to diagram chasing.
 left as an exercise to the student Usually reserved for shortcuts which can be clearly filled-in by any member of the audience with the necessary expertise, but are not so trivial as to be solvable by inspection.
 trivial Similar to clearly.  A concept is trivial if it holds by definition, is an immediate corollary to a known statement, or is a simple special case of a more general concept.

See also
Glossary of mathematics

Notes

References
.
 .
  (Parts I and II).
.
.
.
.
.
 .
.
.

 Jargon
 
Wikipedia glossaries using description lists